Carlos Maggi (5 August 1922, Montevideo, Uruguay – 15 May 2015, Montevideo, Uruguay) was a Uruguayan lawyer, playwright, journalist and writer. Among his acquaintances he was known as "the Kid".

He was one of the last surviving members of the Generation of 45, a Uruguayan intellectual and literary movement: Juan Carlos Onetti, Manuel Flores Mora, Ángel Rama, Emir Rodríguez Monegal, Idea Vilariño, Carlos Real de Azúa, Mauricio Muller, José Pedro Díaz, Amanda Berenguer, Mario Benedetti, Ida Vitale, Líber Falco, among others.

Works 
 Il Duce (2013), opera libretto, with Mauricio Rosencof, music by Federico García Vigil
 1611-2011 Mutaciones y aggiornamientos en la economía y cultura del Uruguay (2011)
 Artigas revelado (2009), with Leonardo Borges
 La nueva historia de Artigas (2005), 8 volumes
 El fin de la discusión (2002)
 La guerra de Baltar (2001)
 Artigas y el lejano norte (1999)
 Esperando a Rodó (1998)
 Los uruguayos y la bicicleta (1995)
 La reforma inevitable (1994)
 Amor y boda de Jorge con Giorgina (1992)
 Con el uno, Ladislao (1992)
 El Uruguay de la tabla rasa (1992)
 Artigas y su hijo el Caciquillo (1991)
 La hija de Gorbachov (1991)
 El Urucray y sus ondas (1991)
 Crispín amores Artigas (1990)
 Un cuervo en la madrugada (1989)
 Los militares, la televisión y otras razones de uso interno (1986)
 El patio de la torcaza (1986)
 Frutos (1985)
 Para siempre y un día (1978)
 Un motivo y Rancho en la noche (1973), on texts by 
 Nueva York A.P.: La muerte de un viajante (1973), about Death of a Salesman by Arthur Miller
 El baile del cangrejo (1971)
 Un motivo (1968)
 El patio de la torcaza (1967)
 Noticias de la aventura del hombre (1966)
 El pianista y el amor (con otros) (1965)
 El Uruguay y su gente (1963)
 La gran viuda (1961)
 La noche de los ángeles inciertos(1960)
 El apuntador (1959)
 La biblioteca (1959)
 Caracol, col, col (1959), con otros
 La trastienda (1958) 
 Polvo enamorado (1951)
 José Artigas, primer estadista de la revolución (1942), with Manuel Flores Mora; in 1941 it obtained an award from the University of the Republic

References

External links
Carlos Maggi, según Carlos Real de Arzúa - ANTOLOGÍA DEL ENSAYO URUGUAYO CONTEMPORÁNEO, Tomo II. pp. 569-570, 1964
"Retrato de un Best-seller: Carlos Maggi" - En Temas, nº 7, junio-julio 1966, por Emir Rodríguez Monegal
"Entrevista a Carlos Maggi" - En Vivencias, mayo 2012, por Andrea Calvete
In memoriam Carlos Maggi
Carlos Maggi recorded at the Library of Congress for the Hispanic Division’s audio literary archive in 1977

1922 births
Uruguayan people of Italian descent
Writers from Montevideo
Uruguayan journalists
20th-century Uruguayan lawyers
Uruguayan dramatists and playwrights
Male dramatists and playwrights
2015 deaths
20th-century dramatists and playwrights
20th-century Uruguayan male writers
Recipients of the Delmira Agustini Medal